A Cool Fish is a 2018 Chinese comedy drama film directed and co-written by Rao Xiaozhi, and starring Chen Jianbin, Ren Suxi, Pan Binlong, and Zhang Yu. The film tells the story of several nobodies, including a cop-turned-security guard Ma Xiaoyong, his sister Ma Jiaqi, and two thieves Li Haigen and Hu Guangsheng. The film premiered in China on November 16, 2018.

Plot 

In a seemingly normal day in a small mountain town, a pair of lowly robbers, a destitute security guard, a physically handicapped but tough-tongued woman, as well as a series of minor characters living on different tracks of society are being thrown together by mistake, because of a lost old gun and robbery occurring that day. Scene of absurd comedy and cause and effect tragedy ensue.

Cast
 Chen Jianbin as Ma Xianyong, a cop-turned-security guard on the construction site.
 Ren Suxi as Ma Jiaqi, younger sister of Ma Xianyong, a quadriplegic.
 Pan Binlong as Li Haigen, nicknamed Big Head, thief.
 Zhang Yu  as Hu Guangsheng, nicknamed Bra (short for Cobra), thief. 
 Ma Yinyin as Zhenzhen, a masseuse.
 Wang Yanhui as Gao Ming, a bankrupt real estate developer.
 Cheng Yi as Liu Wenhong, Gao Ming's lover.
 Ning Huanyu as Gao Xiang, Gao Ming's son.
 Lu Kung-wei as Wang Shuncai, Ma Jiaqi's landlord.
 Deng Enxi as Ma Yiyi, Ma Xianyong's daughter.
 Fan Xiang as Ren Xiaochong, police captain.
 Xie Bo as Bo Zai.

Production
The film is Rao Xiaozhi's second feature.

Soundtrack

Release
The film was released on November 16, 2018, in mainland China, and on November 22, 2018, in Hong Kong.

A Cool Fish earned $1.2 million  its first three days alone, and grossed $24.2 million on its first weekend. The film earned a total of $90.1 million.

Reception
Douban, a major Chinese media rating site, gave the drama 8.1 out of 10.

Accolades

References

External links
 
 
 

2018 films
2010s Mandarin-language films
Sichuanese-language films
Films shot in Guizhou
Films set in Guizhou
Chinese comedy-drama films
2018 comedy-drama films